Bessie Anderson Stanley (born Caroline Elizabeth Anderson, March 25, 1879 – October 2, 1952) was an American writer, the author of the poem Success (What is success? or What Constitutes Success?), which is often incorrectly attributed to Ralph Waldo Emerson or Robert Louis Stevenson.

She was born in Newton, Iowa, and married Arthur Jehu Stanley in 1900, living thereafter in Lincoln, Kansas. Her poem was written in 1904 for a contest held in Brown Book Magazine,<ref name=robin>[http://www.robinsweb.com/truth_behind_success.html The Truth behind the Poem "Success"] (email exchange between Robin Olson and Bethanne Larson, Stanley's great-granddaughter, on "Robin's Web" website)</ref> by George Livingston Richards Co. of Boston, Massachusetts  Mrs. Stanley submitted the words in the form of an essay, rather than as a poem.  The competition was to answer the question "What is success?" in 100 words or less.  Mrs. Stanley won the first prize of $250.

Written in verse form, it reads:

The poem was in Bartlett's Familiar Quotations in the 1930s or 1940s but was mysteriously removed in the 1960s. It was again included in the seventeenth edition.  However, it does appear in a 1911 book, More Heart Throbs, volume 2, on pages 1–2.

Misattribution
Ann Landers (and her sister Abby) are also said to have misattributed the poem to Emerson and her concession to a public correction is in The Ann Landers Encyclopedia''.

Personal life
Bessie Anderson Stanley died in 1952, aged 73.  The verse is inscribed on her gravestone in Lincoln Cemetery, Kansas.

References

"Success", Mila Tasseva for The Ralph Waldo Emerson Society, April 15, 2003

External links

 
 

Poets from Kansas
American women poets
1952 deaths
1879 births
People from Newton, Iowa
People from Lincoln Center, Kansas
Poets from Iowa
20th-century American poets
20th-century American women writers